Democratic Union may refer to:

Croatian Democratic Union
Croatian Democratic Union of Bosnia and Herzegovina
Mongolian Democratic Union
Democratic Union of Alto Adige
Democratic Union (Bosnia and Herzegovina)
Democratic Union (Czech Republic)
Democratic Union (Germany)
Democratic Union (Greece)
Democratic Union (Guatemala)
Democratic Union (Israel)
Democratic Union (Italy)
Democratic Union (Morocco)
Democratic Union (North Macedonia)
Democratic Union (Poland)
Democratic Union (Russia)
Democratic Union (Slovakia)
Democratic Union (Ukraine)

See also
People's Democratic Union (disambiguation)
Democratic Alliance (disambiguation)
Democratic Party (disambiguation)